Sheretnebty was an ancient Egyptian princess of the Fifth Dynasty with the title king's daughter of his body, his beloved. Archaeologists from the Czech Institute of Egyptology unearthed her tomb in 2012, in the Abusir region, south of Cairo. Her burial was found within the rock cut tomb most likely belonging to her husband. His name is lost.

In the complex were found six burial shafts. The biggest one most likely belonged to the husband of the princess. The second shaft was about 10 meters deep with an unfinished burial chamber on the west. Here were found the human remains of a woman, most likely Sheretnebty. She was about 25 to 40 years old when she died.

References 

Princesses of the Fifth Dynasty of Egypt
26th-century BC women
25th-century BC women